Kajaji is a town in the Bono East Region of Ghana.

The town is also known as Nkomi Kajaji. It has a paramount chief and it rotates amongst the three Royal clans in the paramountcy, namely Keleta, Kelempota, and Soome. The paramount stool is vacant due to a protracted litigation between the Keleta and the Kelempota clans as to who succeeds the now-deceased Nana Kwabena Efeda. 

Kajaji is inhabited by many ethnic groups with a population of about 65,000. The city is made up of Kraches (65%) which is the major ethnic group, Basares (12%) and other ethnic groups (23%). The main occupation of most of the inhabitants is in agriculture. The majority practice both yam production and fishing on the Akosombo lake. Kajaji is situated in the Sene East District of the Bono East region, Ghana. Its original name (with diacritics) is Kajaji.

Kajaji became the District Capital of Sene East on 30 June 2012. The district capital has been developing steadily with a buoyant market that receives visitors from all over the country who come there to trade mainly in fish, meat, yam and other foodstuffs.

References

Populated places in the Bono East Region